Count Jean Bonnin de la Bonninière de Beaumont (13 January 1904 – 12 June 2002), known as Jean de Beaumont, was a French businessman, politician, journalist and sport shooter who competed at the 1924 Summer Olympics.

Biography

De Beaumont was born in Paris into an aristocratic French family, the son of Count Marc Louis Bonnin de la Bonninière de Beaumont. His grandfathers were Marc Antoine de Beaumont and surgeon Baron Guillaume Dupuytren. He studied at the École des Roches and École Libre des Sciences Politiques.

De Beaumont was a versatile sportsman and sports official. In 1923, he reached the finals of the 110 metre hurdles at the World Student Games. At the 1924 Olympics, he finished 11th with the French team in the team clay pigeons competition. He served as president of the French Olympic Committee from 1967 to 1971, member of the International Olympic Committee from 1951 to 1971, and vice president of the IOC Executive Committee from 1970 to 1974.

De Beaumont started his business career as an assistant manager on rubber plantations in Indo-China. After returning to France he became president of several companies operating in the Far East and South Africa. Because of his business connections with Africa he was the first IOC Member to actively promote Olympic sports there. In France, de Beaumont served as a Member of Parliament in 1936–40, and fought as a pilot during World War II.

Family

De Beaumont married Paule de Rivaud de La Raffinière in 1928, by whom he had three children:
 Jacqueline, born in 1929;  married vicomte Édouard de Ribes, later comte de Ribes.
 Monique, born in 1930
 Marc, born in 1934.

References

External links

 

1904 births
2002 deaths
Sport shooters from Paris
French male sport shooters
Olympic shooters of France
Shooters at the 1924 Summer Olympics
Trap and double trap shooters
Presidents of the Organising Committees for the Olympic Games
Commandeurs of the Légion d'honneur
International Olympic Committee members